The Mokomokonui River is a river of the northern Hawke's Bay region of New Zealand's North Island. It flows generally southwest from its sources in several streams southwest of Lake Waikaremoana, and flows into the Waipunga River close to the settlement of Tarawera and State Highway 5.

See also
List of rivers of New Zealand

References

Rivers of the Hawke's Bay Region
Rivers of New Zealand